Egypt is competing at the 2013 World Aquatics Championships in Barcelona, Spain on July 20 to August 4, 2013.

Open water swimming

Egypt has qualified the following swimmers in open water marathon.

Men

Women

Mixed

Swimming

Egyptian swimmers earned qualifying standards in the following events (up to a maximum of 2 swimmers in each event at the A-standard entry time, and 1 at the B-standard):

Men

Women

Synchronized swimming

Egypt has qualified twelve synchronized swimmers.

Reserves
 Nour Elayoubi
 Nehal Nabil
 Salma Sherif

References

External links
Egyptian Swimming Federation
Barcelona 2013 Official Site

Nations at the 2013 World Aquatics Championships
2013
World Aquatics Championships